The People Magazine Awards is an American awards ceremony that aired on December 18, 2014 at 9 PM to 11 PM. The only ceremony was hosted by Nick Cannon. The ceremony was held at the Beverly Hilton Hotel in Beverly Hills, California.

Performers for the event included: Pharrell Williams with Gwen Stefani, 5 Seconds of Summer and Maroon 5. Jennifer Aniston, Kevin Hart, Kate Hudson, Michael Keaton and Jennifer Lopez made a special appearance during the show. The ceremony was aired on NBC and was produced by Dick Clark Productions with Allen Shapiro, Mike Mahan and Barry Edelman. Carol Donovan and Michael Dempsey were also executive producers for the event.

The People Magazine Awards allowed fans to vote via Twitter using the hashtag #PEOPLEMagazineAwards for the award of Best People Magazine Cover of the Year.

Categories
 Movie Performance of the Year - Actor
 Movie Performance of the Year - Actress
 Comedy Star of the Year
 TV Performance of the Year - Actor
 TV Performance of the Year - Actress
 Talk Show Host of the Year
 People's Hero of the Year
 Next Generation Star
 Breakout Star of the Year
 Celebrity Role Model of the Year
 Style Icon of the Year
 People's Sexiest Woman
 TV Couple of the Year

People Magazine Award
Reference:
 Movie Performance of the Year - Actor : Michael Keaton
 Movie Performance of the Year - Actress : Jennifer Aniston
 Comedy Star of the Year : Kevin Hart
 TV Performance of the Year - Actor : Jon Hamm
 TV Performance of the Year - Actress : Lisa Kudrow
 Talk Show Host of the Year : Jimmy Fallon
 People's Hero of the Year : Nora Sandigo
 Next Generation Star : Chloë Grace Moretz
 Breakout Star of the Year : Billy Eichner
 Celebrity Role Model of the Year : Kate Hudson
 Style Icon of the Year : Gwen Stefani
 People's Sexiest Woman : Kate Upton
 TV Couple of the Year : Chris Messina & Mindy Kaling
 Triple Threat Award : Jennifer Lopez

Ratings and Reception

The program was watched live by 3.67 million people and garnered a 0.8/3 rating to share ratio amongst the 18-49 age demographic.

References

External links 
 People Magazine Awards Official Website

2014 awards
American television awards
American annual television specials